Konrad Haebler (29 October 1857 – 13 December 1946) was a German (Saxonian) librarian, historian and expert on incunabula.

He studied philology in Leipzig and worked in the royal public library in his native Dresden from 1879.
He specialized in the history and literature of Habsburg Spain.
His research into the economic history of Spain led to an interest in early prints. From 1898, he was in charge of cataloguing the incunabula of Dresden library. For this purpose he began to compile a systematic comparison of types. This led to the publication of his 1905 Typenrepertorium.
From 1904 to 1920, he chaired the commission editing the Gesamtkatalog der Wiegendrucke. 
From 1907, he was at the royal library in Berlin, and from 1914 curator of the manuscript section there.

Bibliography 
 Die wirtschaftliche Blüte Spaniens im 16. Jahrhundert und ihr Verfall (1888).
 The early printers of Spain and Portugal (1897).
 Typenrepertorium der Wiegendrucke (1905). 
 Geschichte Spaniens unter den Habsburgern (1907).
 Handbuch der Inkunabelkunde (1925).
 Rollen- und Plattenstempel des 16. Jahrhunderts (1928–29).

References 
 Wieland Schmidt, Erich von Rath: Die Schriften Konrad Haeblers. Kommission für den Gesamtkatalog der Wiegendrucke, Berlin 1937.
 Katrin Nitzschke: Wissenschaft und Bibliothek. Gelehrte Bibliothekare in der Geschichte der SLUB. In: Wissenschaftliche Zeitschrift der Technischen Universität Dresden. 55, 1/2, 2006, 61–62.
 Katrin Nitzschke: 'Haebler, Konrad'. In: Sächsische Biografie, ed. Martina Schattkowsky, Institut für Sächsische Geschichte und Volkskunde.

German librarians
People from the Kingdom of Saxony
Writers from Dresden
Incunabula
1857 births
1946 deaths
German literary historians
German male non-fiction writers
Members of the Royal Society of Sciences in Uppsala